Habibi Restaurant is a Lebanese, Middle Eastern, and Syrian restaurant in Portland, Oregon.

Description
Habibi Restaurant serves Lebanese, Middle Eastern, and Syrian cuisine including baba ghanoush, falafel, grape leaves stuffed with beef, hummus, meze, pita, shawarma, and tzatziki.

History
Habibi had two locations, as of 2011: 1012 Southwest Morrison Street and 221 Southwest Pine Street. The Pine Street restaurant changed ownership in 2014.

The restaurant enrolled in Prime Now in 2015.
During the COVID-19 pandemic, Habibi operated takeout service and via food delivery apps, as of May 2020.

In October 2020, owner Mazen "Leo" Khoury was stabbed by a customer who refused to pay.

Reception
In 2007, The Oregonian ethnic food guide said, "After one visit to this Lebanese diner, you're a friend; on the second, you're family. Straight-out-of-the-oven pita is perfect, the hummus contends for the city's best, and the Lebanese rice is amazing. Finish with a strong, tasty Turkish coffee or a rosewater juice." DeAnn Welker wrote: 

In 2011, The Oregonian Michael Russell wrote, "This family-run restaurant features Syrian and Lebanese recipes that will make you forgive the nightclub lighting. Stop in for friendly service, tasty falafel and shawarma sandwiches, creamy hummus, and tender marinated kebabs served over flavorful rice." In her 2019 list of the city's ten best places to get hummus, Shannon Gormley of Willamette Week wrote, "If you like your hummus with a rougher texture that's still plenty creamy, Habibi is the place to go. The low-key glitzy Syrian Lebanese restaurant's blend is light and refreshing, the kind of dish that makes you feel healthier."

See also
 List of Lebanese restaurants
 List of Middle Eastern restaurants

References

External links

 
 
 Habibi at Zomato

Asian restaurants in Portland, Oregon
Lebanese restaurants
Lebanese-American culture in Oregon
Middle Eastern restaurants in the United States
Middle Eastern-American culture in Portland, Oregon
Southwest Portland, Oregon
Syrian cuisine
Syrian-American culture in Oregon